Daniel "Danny" McCormack (1876-1938) was an Irish hurler who played for the Dublin senior team.

Born in Borrisoleigh, County Tipperary, McCormack first arrived on the inter-county scene at the age of twenty-four when he first linked up with the Dublin senior. He made his debut during the 1899 championship. McCormack immediately became a regular member of the starting fifteen and won three Leinster medals. He was an All-Ireland runner-up on two occasions.

At club level, McCormack was a seven-time championship medallist with Faughs.

McCormack retired from inter-county hurling following the conclusion of the 1912 championship.

References

1876 births
1938 deaths
Faughs hurlers
Dublin inter-county hurlers